Berns is a surname. Notable people with the surname include:

Alphonse Berns (born 1952), Luxembourg diplomat
Bert Berns (1929–1967), American songwriter
Magdalen Berns (1983–2019), British YouTuber and radical feminist activist
Rick Berns (born 1956), American football player
Sam Berns (1997–2014), American progeria sufferer and campaigner
Thomas B. Berns (1945–2019), American politician, civil engineer, and surveyor
Walter Berns (1919–2015), American law professor

See also
Burns (surname)